A Perfect Fit is a 2005 American thriller written and directed by Ron Brown.The film is produced by Primary Process Productions and stars Adrian Grenier, Leila Arcieri, Polly Draper, Victoria Rowell. It was distributed by Warner Bros. and Polychrome Pictures.

Premise
A mentally unstable young man suffering from horrific nightmares finds that his nightmare has just begun when he meets the woman of his dreams.

Cast
Adrian Grenier as John
Leila Arcieri as Sarah
Polly Draper as Dr Weiss
Victoria Rowell as Sheila
Michele Santopietro as Pat

External links 

2005 films
2005 thriller films
Warner Bros. films
American thriller films
2000s English-language films
2000s American films